Plac may refer to:

 Pro-Life Amendment Campaign (PLAC), anti-abortion campaigners in Ireland, 1983
 Plač, village in northeastern Slovenia
 Plac, Polish for town square, see List of city squares#Poland

See also
 Klonownica-Plac, a village in eastern Poland
 Kotowo-Plac, a village in north-eastern Poland